Luparense F.C. may refer to:

Luparense F.C. (futsal), in San Martino di Lupari, Italy
Luparense F.C. (football), an Italian association football and futsal club in San Martino di Lupari 
Luparense San Paolo F.C.